Hans-Johann Färber (born 20 April 1947) is a German rower who competed for West Germany in the 1968 Summer Olympics and in the 1972 Summer Olympics.

Rowing
At the 1967 European Rowing Championships, he won bronze with Udo Brecht in the coxless pair. At the 1968 Summer Olympics, he was a crew member of the West German boat that finished twelfth in the coxed four event. He competed at the 1970 World Rowing Championships in St. Catharines in the coxed four and won gold. He competed at the 1971 European Rowing Championships and won a gold medal with the coxed four. At the 1972 Summer Olympics in Munich, he was a crew member of the West German boat that won the gold medal in the coxed four event. At the 1974 World Rowing Championships in Lucerne, he won bronze with the coxed four. At the 1975 World Rowing Championships in Nottingham, he won bronze with the coxed four. At the 1976 Summer Olympics in Montreal, he was a crew member of the West German boat that won the bronze medal in the coxed four event.

Family
Färber was born in Šljivoševci, Osijek-Baranja County, Socialist Republic of Croatia, Socialist Federal Republic of Yugoslavia. He lives with his wife in Schwaig in Bavaria. They have three daughters.

Since 2012, he has trained his granddaughter in rowing. Marie-Sophie Zeidler (born 1999) won silver at the 2016 World Rowing Junior Championships with the junior women's eight, and bronze at the 2017 World Rowing Junior Championships with the junior women's coxless pair.

References 

1947 births
Living people
Olympic rowers of West Germany
Rowers at the 1968 Summer Olympics
Rowers at the 1972 Summer Olympics
Rowers at the 1976 Summer Olympics
Olympic gold medalists for West Germany
Olympic bronze medalists for West Germany
Olympic medalists in rowing
West German male rowers
World Rowing Championships medalists for West Germany
Medalists at the 1976 Summer Olympics
Medalists at the 1972 Summer Olympics
European Rowing Championships medalists